Milliken GO Station is a GO Transit train station in Toronto, Ontario, Canada. It is located in the neighbourhood of Milliken which is on the city's northern border with Markham, Ontario.

Description
The station is located south of Steeles Avenue, opposite to the Splendid China Mall shopping centre and is accessed via Redlea Avenue. The station has a straight platform long enough to accommodate a full-length train of ten carriages and a locomotive, which allows the conductor to have a good enough view from the fifth carriage to open all the doors safely. It has a 725-car parking lot, a dedicated passenger pick-up and drop-off area, and a station building with ticket sales counters, a waiting area, and public washrooms.

Due to construction, there are currently train door boarding and exiting restrictions, which mean that passengers cannot board the train or exit the train in certain train cars. Public transit stops have been relocated and traffic on Steeles Avenue has been re-routed to allow for the construction of a grade-separated crossing and a pedestrian bridge over Steeles Avenue.

History
A small shed was built (in latter 19th Century) by the Toronto and Nipissing Railway as a flag stop located on the north side of Steeles Avenue on the east side of the tracks (see postcards) and used by successor railways (Grand Trunk Railway and Canadian National Railways) until it was demolished in the early 1960s. CN continued passenger service on the line (Union to Stouffville from 1971) until 1977 when VIA Rail took over passenger rail service. VIA cut service in 1981.

The first GO station opened on September 7, 1982 and closed on September 2, 2005. It was located on the north side of Steeles in Markham, to the east of the former Market Village Mall. It consisted of a fenced off area with a small ticket booth and 2 large bus shelters. It was one of the most neglected GO railway stations because it was built on a sharp curve, and was much shorter than most GO stations. Because of that, trains could not open all the doors when stopped there. It had no dedicated parking spots and a small kiss-and-ride area. Cars waiting for the trains were parked at Market Village or along Steeles Avenue. There are no traces of the former platform, other than a single sign facing towards Steeles Avenue reading "CN Milliken" which has since been removed after double tracking work. The old station footprint is now on the northbound tracks.

The second GO station opened on September 6, 2005 on the south side of Steeles Avenue and was accessed by a re-aligned Redlea Avenue. The new location allowed the construction of a parking lot for 680 vehicles and an accessible new station.

Milliken GO Station has been undergoing redevelopment since 2019 to support future growth, including two way, all day 15-minute interval service between Union Station and Unionville Station. Once complete, along with the grade-separated crossing and the pedestrian bridge over Steeles Avenue, there will be a longer renovated existing platform, a new second station platform and track, two pedestrian tunnels and elevators, new shelters, and access from both platforms to a covered pedestrian bridge over Steeles Avenue. The redevelopment is planned to be completed by the end of 2022.

Connecting transit
The station is not directly served by regular local transit services, but there is a short connecting walkway beside the railway tracks to bus stops on Steeles Avenue East.

Toronto Transit Commission's bus routes 53 Steeles East operates along Steeles Avenue East and 43 Kennedy terminates by looping there, as does the 57 Midland.

York Region Transit route 8 Kennedy stops at the Steeles Avenue and Kennedy Road intersection.

References

External links

GO Transit railway stations
Railway stations in Canada opened in 2005
Railway stations in Toronto
Transport in Scarborough, Toronto
1982 establishments in Ontario